Willie Limond (born 2 February 1979) is a Scottish professional boxer. He held the EBU European Union super featherweight title in 2004, the Commonwealth lightweight title from 2006 to 2007, the Commonwealth super lightweight title from 2013 to 2014, and the British super lightweight title in 2014.

Early career

Willie Limond's professional career began in 1999 with a win over journeyman Lenny Hodgkins, before proceeding to beat a number of superfeatherweights, including a notable win over future WBU featherweight champion and IBO world title challenger, Choi Tseveenpurev. 
 
This led to a showdown with fellow Scotsman "Amazing" Alex Arthur for the British Superfeatherweight title on 12 December 2003 at the Braehad Arena, Glasgow. Both men went into the fight undefeated, and the bout was thought to be the biggest all-Scottish bout for the British title in some 30 years. Unfortunately Limond's hopes of becoming British champ were shattered as future-WBO World champ Alex Arthur was too much for him and he was defeated by TKO in the 8th round. There were rumours of a rematch following the bout, but it never happened.

EBU-EU Superfeatherweight title

Following his loss to Alex Arthur, Limond went on to pick up a few more wins before earning himself a shot at European Boxing Union Superfeatherweight title. He fought the French champion Youssouf Djibaba on 19 June 2004, at the Braehead Arena, the same venue where he had a lost to Alex Arthur almost a year earlier. Limond won the vacant belt via unanimous decision.
 
After a series of victories over journeyman and a successful defense of his newly won crown against Spain's Alberto Lopez, in subsequent bouts Limond moved on from the EU title. Looking to ascend further up the rankings, Limond went on to win the Celtic Superfeatherweight title against recent Commonwealth title challenger, Kevin O'Hara.

Commonwealth Lightweight title

After his Celtic title win, followed by an easy victory over Jus Walley, Limond stepped up to lightweight and took on Ghana's Joshua Allotey for the vacant Commonwealth title. On 4 November 2006 at the Kelvin Hall, Glasgow, Limond won the title via unanimous decision.
 
Limond lost the title in his first defense, to rising prospect Amir Khan in the 8th round on 14 July 2007. He had knocked Khan down earlier in the fight but ultimately failed to defeat the 2004 Olympic Silver medallist Khan. The loss was not without controversy, as some spectators thought that Khan had been given a long count after Limond had sent him to the canvas.

IBO Inter-Continental & WBU Lightweight title

With the loss of his Commonwealth title, he defeated Martin Watson for the vacant IBO Inter-Continental title on 29 March 2008, at the Scottish Exhibition and Conference Centre, Glasgow on a unanimous points decision, which placed him back in the reckoning for a world title fight. This was followed by a points victory over Matt Scriven, before going onto challenge for the WBU lightweight title. Willie Limond was due be fighting Zambian champion Godwin Mutampuka in Paisley on 27 February for the vacant WBU lightweight title but his opponent failed his medical, with rumours being it was due to being HIV positive. Instead, Limond fought Harry Ramogoadi to a points victory in a non-title bout.
 
Limond eventually got his chance, and fought English champion Ryan Barrett for the WBU lightweight title on 29 June. Limond won the bout at the Thistle Hotel, Glasgow by unanimous decision.

Bout with Erik Morales

On 11 September 2010, Limond took on former champion Erik Morales for the WBC Silver light-welterweight title. Limond started off strongly landing some clean shots, however the experience of Morales proved too much as in the 6th round he caught Limond with a blistering body Shot. As a result, Limond went down 3 times in the sixth Round and the referee called the fight off, awarding Morales a KO Victory.

After Morales: new promoter, victory against Arek Malek and last fight

After signing with promoter Tommy Gilmour, Limond scored an easy 6-round decision over Polish journeyman Arek Malek at the Kelvin Hall, Glasgow in June 2011. On 25 November 2011 Limond fought Anthony Crolla for the British lightweight title but lost by unanimous decision. Englishman Crolla, a friend of Limond's, was the stronger in the latter rounds with the scorecard 120–108, 120-108 and 120–109. After the bout Limond refused to confirm that he would retire but instead consider his options.

Limond comeback
Willie returned from the Anthony Crolla setback with a routine 6 round win over Englishman William Warburton in Dundee, after moving up to light welterweight from lightweight. 2013 began with a bang when Willie Limond fought fellow Scot Eddie Doyle, the unbeaten British masters champion, for the Commonwealth light welterweight title. Limond won in style, dropping his younger opponent twice before winning in the first round by way of tko. Limond is now expected to make his first British title defence against unbeaten Welsh prospect Chris Jenkins on 23 January 2015 at the Phones 4u Arena in Manchester.

External links
 
 BritishBoxing.net biography
 Official Website
 Willie Limond interview with stv, 12 June 2007.
 Limond relishes Mutampuka test

1979 births
Living people
Boxers from Glasgow
Scottish male boxers
Lightweight boxers